Sam Ayers (born Samuel Bielich III) is an American actor.

Ayers was born in Youngstown, Ohio, the son of Samuel Bielich Jr., a director of construction and carpenter. He was raised in Merrimack, New Hampshire. He moved to New York City and began using his mother's name of Ayers as his professional name. He found recurring roles on several soap operas. Ayers moved to Los Angeles permanently in 1995. Sam married actress Robin Lynne Trapp in 1998; they welcomed daughter Alexis Ann into their family the following year.

Filmography

References

External links

American male soap opera actors
Living people
Male actors from Youngstown, Ohio
Year of birth missing (living people)